The 2020–21 Georgia Southern Eagles women's basketball team represented Georgia Southern University during the 2020–21 NCAA Division I women's basketball season. The basketball team, led by first-year head coach Anita Howard, played all home games at the Hanner Fieldhouse along with the Georgia Southern Eagles men's basketball team. They were members of the Sun Belt Conference.

Previous season 
The Eagles finished the 2019–20 season 10–20, 7–11 in Sun Belt play to finish ninth place in the conference. They made it to the 2019-20 Sun Belt Conference women's basketball tournament where they were defeated by Louisiana in the First Round. Shortly after their elimination, the remainder of the tournament as well as all postseason play was cancelled due to the COVID-19 pandemic.

Offseason

Departures

Transfers

Recruiting

Roster

Schedule and results

|-
!colspan=9 style=| Non-conference Regular Season
|-

|-
!colspan=9 style=| Conference Regular Season
|-

|-
!colspan=9 style=| Non-conference Regular Season

|-
!colspan=9 style=| Conference Regular Season

|-
!colspan=9 style=| Sun Belt Tournament

See also
 2020–21 Georgia Southern Eagles men's basketball team

References

Georgia Southern Eagles women's basketball seasons
Georgia Southern Eagles
Georgia Southern Eagles women's basketball
Georgia Southern Eagles women's basketball